Judo at the 2019 Military World Games was held in Wuhan, China from 19 to 22 October 2019.

Medal summary

Men

Women

Team

References

 2019 Military World Games Results - Page 106

External links
 

Judo
Military World Games
2019
2019